Clara Lago Grau (born 6 March 1990) is a Spanish actress.

Career 
Clara Lago Grau was born on 6 March 1990 in Torrelodones, Community of Madrid. Lago made her film debut at the age of 9 with the Spanish film Terca Vida (2000) (she had previously appeared in a Spanish TV series) and in the same year joined the cast of Compañeros (Antena 3).

In 2002 she starred in Carol's Journey, a film directed by Imanol Uribe for which Lago was nominated for a Goya Award for Best New Actress.

She won the 'Best New Talent in Spanish Cinema' awarded by L'Oreal in the 2008 56th San Sebastian Film Festival.

Clara won the Shooting Stars Award by the ICAA for the European Film Academy and the Berlin International Film Festival in 2011 for her role in the film The Hidden Face.

In November 2012 she played Eva in Fin, along Maribel Verdú and Daniel Grao.

In 2014, Lago starred in Spanish Affair. The film broke Spanish box-office records, becoming the top-grossing Spanish title of all time with more than $75 million in sales and sitting. Then she portrayed in the stage play La venus de las pieles, directed by David Serrano de la Peña.

Lago appears in the 2015 film Extinction along with Matthew Fox and Jeffrey Donovan, in an adaptation of Juan de Dios Garduño's bestseller book Y pese a todo.

In 2017 she dubbed Cleopatra in the video game Assassin's Creed: Origins. It is the first time she  participated in the dubbing of a video game.

Personal life 
In 2013, Lago began a relationship with her Ocho Apellidos co-star Dani Rovira. The couple officially broke up in 2019 after 5 years of dating. Lago speaks fluent English and Spanish. In March 2017 she started a vegan diet due to an ethical and environmental decision that gives her "peace of mind", she also says that she feels "full of energy" and is "perfect" in health.

Filmography

Film

Television

Notes

External links 

 
 
 
 

1990 births
Actresses from the Community of Madrid
Spanish film actresses
Living people
20th-century Spanish actresses
21st-century Spanish actresses
Spanish child actresses